Dilip Roy (17 December 1931 – 2 September 2010) was an Indian Bengali film actor and director. He worked in Bengali films. Roy was born in Chittagong, Bangladesh.

Death
Roy died on 2 September 2010 at Kolkata, India at the age of 79 due to cancer

Filmography

Actor

 Autograph (2010)
 Mon Mane Na (2008)
 Ek Mutho Chabi (2005)
 Shubhodristi (2005)
 Moner Manush (1997)
 Himghar (1996)
 Sangharsha (1995)
 Phiriye Dao (1994)
 Nati Binodini (1994)
 Abbajan (1994)
 Rakter Saad (1993)
 Tomar Rakte Amar Sohag (1993)
 Maya Mamata (1993)
 Shet Patharer Thala (1992)
 Indrajit (1992)
 Abhagini (1991)
 Kagojer Nouka (1991)
 Nabab (1991)
 Debata (1990)
 Garmil (1990)
 Hirak Jayanti (1990)
 Toofan (1989)
 Ora Charjan (1988)
 Debika (1987)
 Tin purush (1986) 
 Mohanar Dike (1984)
 Surya Trishna (1984)
 Abhinay Nay (1983)
 Ashleelotar Daye (1983)
 Dui Purush (1978)
 Ranger Saheb (1978)
 Dhanraj Tamang (1978)
 Sei Chokh (1976)
 Agnishwar (1975)
 Rodanbhara Basanta (1974)
 Ami Sirajer Begam (1973)
 Apanjan (1968)
 Gar Nasimpur (1968)
 Prastar Swakshar (1967)
 Ajana Sapath (1967)
 Joradighir Chowdhury Paribar (1966)
 Rajdrohi (1966)
 Aasmaan Mahal (1965)
 Arohi (1965)
 Abhaya O Srikanta (1965)
 Sorry Madam (1962)
 Bhagini Nivedita (1962)
 Kathin Maya (1961)
 Jhinder Bandi (1961)
 Kshudhita Pashan (1960)
 Parivar (1956)

 Kshaniker Atithi (1959)

Director

 Garmil (1990)
 Neelkantha (1985)
 Amrita Kumbher Sandhane (1982)
 Debdas (1979)

References

External links 
 
 Dilip Roy  in Gomolo

1931 births
2010 deaths
Male actors in Bengali cinema
Indian male film actors
Bengali film directors
Bengali Hindus
Indian Hindus
Male actors from Kolkata
20th-century Indian male actors
20th-century Indian film directors
21st-century Indian male actors
Film directors from Kolkata